Micronoctua is a monotypic moth genus of the family Erebidae. Its only species, Micronoctua karsholti, is known from southern Turkey, Cyprus, the islands of south-east Greece, and the northern Levant (including Lebanon, Syria and Israel). Both the genus and the species were first described by Michael Fibiger in 1997.

It is the smallest of all species of the superfamily Noctuoidea.

The wingspan is 6–9 mm. The resting position is flat, with the forewing hind margins against each other. The hindwing venation is bifid. The head, patagia and prothorax are blackish, while the rest of the thorax and ground colour of the forewing is unicolorous dark greyish brown. All crosslines of the forewing are present and black. The fringes are grey. The hindwing is light greyish brown. The underside is unicolorous light brown, with a weakly marked postmedian line and a discal spot.

The habitat consists of warm, dry areas in open grassland with many herbaceous plants and open pine forests. There are multiple generations per year and adults have been recorded from April to October.

Former species
Micronoctua occi is now Parens occi (Fibiger & Kononenko, 2008)

References

Micronoctuini
Moths of Europe
Monotypic moth genera